James FitzGerald, 6th Earl of Desmond (d. 1462), called 'the Usurper', was a younger son of Gerald FitzGerald, 3rd Earl of Desmond, and Lady Eleanor, daughter of James Butler, 2nd Earl of Ormond.

Life
The younger brother of John FitzGerald, 4th Earl of Desmond, James was uncle to the 4th Earl's only son Thomas FitzGerald, 5th Earl of Desmond, whom he was able to deprive of his earldom and dispossess in 1418 for marrying far below his station. The marriage between a man of Norman ancestry and a woman of Gaelic blood was in violation of the Statutes of Kilkenny. James FitzGerald took a leading role in forcing his nephew into exile in France where he died at Rouen two years later.

Although not acknowledged until 1422, he was in 1420 made Seneschal of Imokilly, Inchiquin, and the town of Youghal, by James Butler, 4th Earl of Ormond. Also in 1420, he founded the Franciscan friary at Askeaton Abbey.

In 1423 he was made Constable of Limerick for life. In 1445 he was excused attendance at Parliament. Along with his son-in-law Thomas FitzGerald, 7th Earl of Kildare, James was a prominent Irish supporter of the House of York.

He was also godfather to George Plantagenet, 1st Duke of Clarence.

Dying in 1462 or 1463, Desmond was buried at the Franciscan friary in Youghal.

Marriage and issue
James married Mary, daughter of William de Burgh, and they had issue two sons:
 Thomas FitzGerald, 7th Earl of Desmond
 Sir Gerald Mor FitzGerald, ancestor of the FitzGerald Lords of Decies of County Waterford
and two daughters:

 Honor, married Thomas Fitzmaurice., Lord of Kerry
 Joan/Jane, married Thomas FitzGerald, 7th Earl of Kildare

Ancestry

Notes

References

 Burke, Bernard, A Genealogical History of the Dormant, Abeyant, Forfeited, and Extinct Peerages of the British Empire. London: Harrison. 1866. p. 204
 Cokayne, George Edward, Complete Peerage of England, Scotland, Ireland, Great Britain and the United Kingdom, Extant, Extinct, or Dormant. Volume III. London: George Bell & Sons. 1890. p. 85

James
Normans in Ireland
Norman warriors
15th-century Irish people
1463 deaths
Year of birth unknown
Earls of Desmond (1329 creation)